NQU may refer to:

National Quemoy University, a national university in Jinning Township, Kinmen, Taiwan
North Queensferry railway station, Fife, Scotland, National Rail station code